Lost in Space is a 1998 American science-fiction adventure film directed by Stephen Hopkins, and starring William Hurt, Matt LeBlanc, Gary Oldman, and Heather Graham. The plot is adapted from the 1965–1968 CBS television series of the same name (itself inspired by the 1812 novel The Swiss Family Robinson by Johann David Wyss). Several actors from the TV show make cameo appearances.

The film focuses on the Robinson family, who undertake a voyage to a nearby star system to begin large-scale emigration from a soon-to-be uninhabitable Earth, but are thrown off course by a saboteur and must try to find their way home.

Lost in Space received negative reviews from critics and grossed $136.2 million worldwide with an $80 million budget.

Plot

In 2058, Earth will soon be uninhabitable due to the irreversible effects of pollution and ozone depletion. In an effort to save humanity, the United Global Space Force sends Professor John Robinson, his wife Maureen, daughters Judy and Penny, and young prodigy son Will on the spaceship Jupiter II to complete construction of a hypergate over the planet Alpha Prime, which will allow the population of Earth to be instantly transported and populate the new planet. Penny rebels by breaking curfew, while Will's prize-winning science experiment involving time travel goes largely unnoticed by John. Global Sedition, a mutant terrorist group, assassinates the Jupiter II'''s pilot, who is replaced by hotshot fighter pilot Major Don West, to his chagrin.

The family's physician Dr. Zachary Smith, a Sedition spy, sabotages the ship's on-board robot before launch, but is betrayed by his cohorts and left unconscious as the ship launches and the family enters cryosleep. The robot activates and begins to destroy the navigation and guidance systems, en route to destroying the family. Smith awakens the Robinsons and West, who manage to subdue the robot, but the ship is falling uncontrollably into the Sun. Forced to use the experimental hyperdrive with an unplotted course, the ship is transported through hyperspace to a remote planet in an uncharted part of the universe.

Passing through a strange distortion in space, the crew finds two abandoned ships in orbit: the Earth ship Proteus, and another ship clearly not of human origin. They board the Proteus, with Will controlling the now-modified robot. They find navigational data to reach Alpha Prime, and a camouflaging creature Penny calls "Blarp", along with evidence suggesting the ship is from the future. They are attacked by spider-like creatures; one scratches Smith, and the robot's body is irreparably damaged but Will saves its computerized intelligence.

West destroys the vessel to eradicate the spiders, causing the ship to crash-land on the nearby planet, where another distortion appears. Will theorizes they are distortions in time, as his experiment predicted, but John ignores his input. Exploring the time bubble, he and West encounter a future version of Will and a robot he rebuilt with the saved intelligence.  (The time-travel illusions in the 1967 Lost in Space television episode "Flight into the Future," such as a future statue of the Robot and descendants of Dr. Smith and Judy, are likely an influence on this part of the film.)  The older Will explains that surviving spiders killed Maureen, Penny, and Judy. Constructing a time machine, the future Will intends to return to Earth to prevent Jupiter II from launching.

Young Will and Smith investigate the time bubble on their own. Smith tricks Will into handing over his weapon, but is foiled by a future version of himself, transformed by his spider injury into a spider-like creature, who has been protecting Will since the rest of the family was killed. The present Will and West return to the Jupiter II with an injured Smith and the robot in tow, while the future Smith reveals his true plan: He killed the Robinsons, but kept Will alive to build the time machine, so Smith could return to Earth and populate it with a race of spiders.

John, remembering that spiders eat their wounded, rips open Smith's egg sac with a trophy Will turned into a weapon. Smith's spider army devours him and he is thrown into the time portal, ripping him apart. The planet's increasing instability forces the Jupiter II to take off, but they are unable to reach escape velocity and are destroyed by the planet's debris. Realizing his father never actually abandoned them, and that he really does love him, Will sets the time machine to send John back to his family, but there is only enough power for one person. Saying goodbye to his family, the future Will is killed by falling debris, and John reunites with his living family.

Realizing they do not have enough power to escape the planet's gravitational pull, John suggests they drive the ship down through the planet, using the gravity well to slingshot them back into space. They are successful, but the planet turns into a black hole, and they activate the hyperdrive to escape. Using the Proteus’ navigational data to set a potential course for Alpha Prime, the ship blasts off into hyperspace.

Cast
 William Hurt as Professor John Robinson
 Mimi Rogers as Professor Maureen Robinson
 Heather Graham as Dr. Judy Robinson
 Lacey Chabert as Penny Robinson
 Jack Johnson as Will Robinson
 Jared Harris as Older Will Robinson
 Matt LeBlanc as Major Don West
 Gary Oldman as Dr. Zachary Smith / Spider Smith
 Dick Tufeld as the voice of Robot
 Lennie James as Jeb Walker
 Mark Goddard as General
 June Lockhart as Principal 
 Marta Kristen as Reporter #1
 Angela Cartwright as Reporter #2
 Edward Fox as Businessman
 Gary A. Hecker as voice of Blarp

Production
Filming began on March 3, 1997 in London's Shepperton Studios, with more than 700 special effects shots planned, done by Industrial Light & Magic and Jim Henson's Creature Shop. The $70 million Lost in Space film was New Line's hope to launch a multimedia franchise, followed by animated and live-action television series. Licensing deals were made with Trendmasters for toys and Harper Prism and Scholastic for tie-in novels.

Music
TVT Records released a soundtrack album on March 31, 1998, featuring 11 tracks of Bruce Broughton's original score (which makes no reference to either of the TV themes composed by John Williams) and eight tracks of electronic techno music (most of which is heard only over the film's end credits). A European version of the soundtrack album was released that omits the tracks "Spider Attack", "Jupiter Crashes", and "Spider Smith", and instead includes three new songs unused in the film ("Aah-Yah" by O.P. Phoenix, "Asphalt Ostrich" by HeadCrash, and "Anarchy" by KMFDM). Intrada Records released a score album for the film the following year, and the complete score in 2016. The track "Thru the Planet" on the TVT album is not the same as "Through the Planet" on the Intrada release, but is a shortened version of Broughton's unused end-title music heard on the score album as "Lost in Space."

TVT Records Soundtrack Album

Intrada score album

Release
On its opening weekend, Lost in Space grossed $20,154,919 and debuted at number one at the US box office, ending Titanics 15-week-long hold on the first-place position. It opened in a record 3,306 theaters and grossed an average of $6,096 per screening. Lost in Space grossed $69,117,629 in the United States and Canada, and $67,041,794 internationally, bringing its worldwide total to $136,159,423.

ReceptionLost in Space was panned by critics on release. Roger Ebert gave the film a rating of one and a half out of four, calling it a "dim-witted shoot-'em-up". Wade Major of BoxOffice rated the film at 1 and a half out of 5, calling it "the dumbest and least imaginative adaptation of a television series yet translated to the screen." James Berardinelli was slightly more favorable, giving the film a rating of 2 and a half out of 4. While praising the film's set design, he criticized its "meandering storyline and lifeless protagonists," saying that "Lost in Space features a few action sequences that generate adrenaline jolts, but this is not an edge-of-the-seat motion picture."

Online aggregators have tracked both contemporary and recent reviews of Lost in Space. At Rotten Tomatoes, the film has an approval rating of 27% based on 84 appraisals, with an average score of 4.9/10. The site's consensus reads: "Clumsily directed and missing most of the TV series' campy charm, Lost in Space sadly lives down to its title." The film holds a score of 42 out of 100 on Metacritic, based on the opinions of 19 journalists, indicating "mixed or average reviews". Audiences polled by CinemaScore gave the film an average grade of "B−" on an A+ to F scale.

AccoladesLost in Space received six Saturn Award nominations, including Best Supporting Actor for Oldman. The film also received a Golden Raspberry Award nomination for Worst Remake or Sequel, but lost to the tied Godzilla, The Avengers and Psycho.

At the 1998 Stinkers Bad Movie Awards, the film won Worst Supporting Actress for Chabert and was nominated for four other awards: Worst Song in a Movie for "Lost in Space" (lost to "Come with Me"), Worst Resurrection of a TV Show (lost to The Avengers), Worst Director for Hopkins (lost to Jeremiah Chechik for The Avengers), and Worst Picture (lost to Spice World'').

Home media
VHS, DVD, and later a Blu-ray have been released for the film.  Both the DVD and Blu-ray releases contain deleted scenes.

References

External links
 
 
 
 
 
 

Lost in Space
1990s American films
1998 films
1990s English-language films
1990s science fiction action films
1990s science fiction adventure films
American films with live action and animation
American robot films
American science fiction action films
American space adventure films
Black holes in film
Films about terrorism
Films adapted into comics
Films based on television series
Films directed by Stephen Hopkins
Films produced by Akiva Goldsman
Films scored by Bruce Broughton
Films set in 2058
Films set in the future
Films set on fictional planets
Films set on spacecraft
Films shot in England
Films shot in London
Films shot at Shepperton Studios
New Line Cinema films
Films with screenplays by Akiva Goldsman
Films about time travel